Vaman Shivram Apte (1858 – 9 August 1892) was an Indian lexicographer and a professor of Sanskrit at Pune's Fergusson College.

He is best known for his compilation of a dictionary, The Student's English-Sanskrit Dictionary.

Works
 The Practical Sanskrit-English Dictionary (1890), 
 
 The Students' English-Sanskrit Dictionary (1884)
 The Students' Sanskrit-English Dictionary, 
 The Students' Guide to Sanskrit Composition (1881)
 The Students' Hand-Book of Progressive Exercises, Part I and II
 Kusuma-mala (1891)

References

Indian Sanskrit scholars
Indian lexicographers
1858 births
1892 deaths
19th-century Indian linguists
19th-century lexicographers